Mozyr State Pedagogical University is a higher educational institution based in Mozyr, Gomel Region, Belarus.

History
Founded in 1944 as the Mozyr Teachers' Institute. The training of teachers was conducted in three departments: language and literature, physics and mathematics, natural history and geography. The structure of the institute consisted of 7 departments, which employed 27 teachers. In 1946, the first graduation took place: 86 teachers of history, language and literature, 32 - physics and mathematics, 36 - natural history and chemistry.

In 1952 the university was reorganized as the Mozyr Pedagogical Institute by Resolution of the Council of Ministers № 999 signed on July 22, 1952. In 1964 the institute was named after Nadezhda Krupskaya. In 2002, the institute was transformed into the Mozyr State Pedagogical University, which was named in 2006 after the People's Writer of Belarus Ivan Shamiakin in according with by a presidential decree.

External links
 Official website

References

Universities in Belarus
Buildings and structures in Vitebsk
Universities and institutes established in the Soviet Union
Educational institutions established in 1944
1945 establishments in the Soviet Union